Hop Creek is a stream in the U.S. state of South Dakota.

Hop Creek received its name from the abundant hops on its course.

See also
List of rivers of South Dakota

References

Rivers of Lawrence County, South Dakota
Rivers of Pennington County, South Dakota
Rivers of South Dakota